Padmini Murthy is a physician, Professor and Global Health Director at New York Medical College. In 2016 she was awarded the Elizabeth Blackwell Medal by the American Medical Women's Association for her contribution to the field of women in medicine.

Biography 
Murthy is a qualified physician. She attended medical school at Guntur Medical College in India, and she did her residency in Obstetrics and Gynecology.

She has a Masters in Public Health and a Masters in Management from New York University, and is a Certified Health Education Specialist with the National Commission for Health Education Credentialing.

She is author of Women’s Global Health and Human Rights, published in 2010.

She services on United Nations NGO committees and has previously been a consultant to the United Nations. She was appointed Chair of the Committee on Women’s Rights of the American Public Health Association for three consecutive terms.

She is currently Associate Professor in Health Policy and Management and Family and Community Medicine and Global Health Director at New York Medical College.

Awards 
Murthy became a Fellow of the New York Academy of Medicine in 2010.

In 2015 Murthy was named Professional of the Year by the International Association of Who's Who, for her achievements in medicine, education and public health. She was awarded the Marie Catchatoor Memorial Award in 2013, the Dr Lata Patil Inaugural Oration Award in 2016, and the Dr Homi Colabawalla Oration Award. She was also awarded the Sojourner Truth Pin, awarded to women who excel in community service, and has received the Jhirad Oration Award.

In 2016 she was awarded the Elizabeth Blackwell Medal, the highest award given by the American Medical Women's Association, which recognises annually a woman physician for her outstanding contribution to the cause of women in medicine.

References 

Living people
21st-century Indian medical doctors
Indian women medical doctors
New York University alumni
20th-century Indian medical doctors
Year of birth missing (living people)